Nagia amplificans is a species of moth in the family Erebidae. It is found in South Africa, where it has been recorded from KwaZulu-Natal.

References

Endemic moths of South Africa
Nagia
Moths described in 1858
Moths of Africa